Porgy and Bess is a recording of the Glyndebourne Festival Opera version of the George Gershwin opera of the same name. The cast were accompanied by the London Philharmonic Orchestra under the direction of Simon Rattle. The recording took place in February 1988 in No.1 Studio of Abbey Road in London. It was released in 1989.

The 1993 TV adaptation  of Porgy and Bess used this recording as its soundtrack, and featured most of the original cast of the Glyndebourne production. Bruce Hubbard, who had died in 1991, did not appear, although his singing voice was heard as Jake, while Gordon Hawkins played the role onscreen. Likewise, soprano Harolyn Blackwell's voice was heard as Clara, although Paula Ingram played the role.

In the opinion of many critics, this version, along with the 1977 Houston Grand Opera recording, comes closest to the original opera as conceived by Gershwin, before the cuts made prior to the Broadway premiere.

Cast
Willard White as Porgy
Cynthia Haymon as Bess
Harolyn Blackwell as Clara
Damon Evans as Sportin' Life
Gregg Baker as Crown
Cynthia Clarey as Serena
Marietta Simpson as Maria
Bruce Hubbard as Jake
Colenton Freeman as Crab-man
William Johnson as Frazier
Curtis Watson as Jim
Camellia Johnson as The Strawberry Woman
The Glyndebourne Chorus
The London Philharmonic Orchestra
Sir Simon Rattle, conductor

Originally released as EMI #7-49568-2, it was reissued as EMI #7243-5-56220-2-0 in 1997.  A one CD highlights version is available as EMI #0777-7-54325-2-7.

Awards
1989 Gramophone Award for an operatic work 
1990 International Record Critics' Award
Caecilia Prijs
Edison Stichting
Penguin Guide
Grand Prix du Disque of the Charles Cros Academy

References

External links
Review at GrandiTenori.com

1980s classical albums
Glyndebourne album
EMI Classics albums